The 1974 KFK competitions in Ukraine were part of the 1974 Soviet KFK competitions that were conducted in the Soviet Union. It was 10th season of the KFK in Ukraine since its introduction in 1964.

First stage

Group 1

Group 2

Group 3

Group 4

Group 5

Group 6

Final

References

Ukrainian Football Amateur League seasons
4
Soviet
Soviet
football